Dorne Allen Dibble (April 16, 1929 – March 1, 2018) was an American football wide receiver for the Detroit Lions (1951, 1953–1957).  He attended Michigan State.

Dibble was the Lions’ third-round draft pick in 1951 after starring at Michigan State where he earned All-America honors as a defensive end his senior year.  The Lions converted him to receiver and the switch paid instant dividends.  Dibble tied Doak Walker’s record for the most touchdown receptions by a rookie with six TD catches in 1951.  Dibble also set the Lions’ rookie record for yards per catch average that season at 20.4 – 30 catches for 613 yards.

Dibble served the 1952 season in the military, but came back to star for the Lions from 1953–1957 and helped the Detroit win the NFL Championships in 1953 and 1957.  The Lions also went to the title game in 1954, the year Dibble led Detroit receivers and ranked fifth in the NFL with 46 receptions for 768 yards and six touchdowns.

In his career, Dibble had 146 receptions for 2,552 yards – a 17.5 yards-per-catch average – and 19 TDs.

Dibble died in Northville, Michigan, on March 1, 2018, of pneumonia at the age of 88.

References

1929 births
2018 deaths
People from Adrian, Michigan
Players of American football from Michigan
American football wide receivers
Michigan State Spartans football players
Detroit Lions players